Metro Clark is a loosely defined area which includes portions of Pampanga and Tarlac. The area was the site of Clark Air Base, a former military base by the United States.

Scope
The Metro Clark area covers the following towns and cities. The scope of this area may include or exclude the following localities:

Pampanga
Angeles City*
Bacolor
Mabalacat*
Mexico
San Fernando
Porac*
Tarlac
Bamban*
Capas*

Metro Clark also includes the Clark Freeport Zone.

See also 

 Metro Manila
 Metro Cebu
 Metro Davao

References

Central Luzon
Geography of Tarlac
Geography of Pampanga